Sally Anne Boyer is the 2007 World Series of Poker bracelet winner in the $1,000 World Championship Ladies Event No Limit Hold'em event.

She is from Park City, Utah.

Prior to the 2007 event, Boyer had only been playing poker for less than a year.  She did, however, attend the debut of the World Series of Poker Ladies Academy.

As of 2014, Boyer has tournament winnings of $267,685.

World Series of Poker bracelets

References

American poker players
World Series of Poker bracelet winners
Female poker players
Living people
Year of birth missing (living people)